Universal mind or universal consciousness is a metaphysical concept suggesting an underlying essence of all being and becoming in the universe. It includes the being and becoming that occurred in the universe prior to the arising of the concept of Mind, a term that more appropriately refers to the organic, human aspect of universal consciousness. It addresses inorganic being and becoming and the interactions that occur in that process without specific reference to the physical and chemical laws that try to describe those interactions. Those interactions have occurred, do occur, and continue to occur. Universal consciousness is the source that underlies those interactions and the awareness and knowledge they imply.

Introduction

The concept of universal mind was presented by Anaxagoras, a Pre-Socratic philosopher who arrived in Athens some time after 480 BC. He taught that the growth of living things depends on the power of mind within the organisms that enables them to extract nourishment from surrounding substances. For this concept of mind, Anaxagoras was commended by Aristotle. Both Plato and Aristotle, however, objected that his notion of mind did not include a view that mind acts ethically, i.e. acts for the “best interests” of the universe.

The most original aspect of Anaxagoras's system was his doctrine of nous ("mind" or "reason"). A different Greek word, gnósi (knowledge), better reflects what is observed in the wider world of organic and inorganic being than just the human world.

Chu Ch’an says, “Universal mind, therefore, is something to which nothing can be attributed. Being absolute, it is beyond attributes. If for example, it were to be described as infinite, that would exclude from it whatever is finite, but the whole argument of the book is that universal mind is the only reality and that everything we apprehend through our senses, is nothing else but this mind. Even to think of it in terms of existence or non-existence is to misapprehend it entirely.” pp. 8–9

The term surfaced again in later philosophy, as in the writings of Hegel. - Hegel writes:

Descriptions
There are no definitions of the Universal Mind, but two authors within the New Thought movement offer vague descriptions in superlatives such as omnipotence.

Ernest Holmes, the founder of the Science of Mind movement: 

New Thought author Charles Haanel said of the universal mind and its relationship to humans:

The nature of the universal mind is said to be omnipresent.

See also
 Panpsychism
 Mana (Mandaeism)

References

Sources
 Anaxagoras. (2013). Encyclopædia Britannica. Encyclopædia Britannica Deluxe Edition.  Chicago: Encyclopædia Britannica.
 Anaxagoras. (2013). Encyclopædia Britannica. Encyclopædia Britannica Deluxe Edition.  Chicago: Encyclopædia Britannica.
 Blofeld., J., under pseudonym Chu Ch'an,1947 "The Huang Po Doctrine of Universal Mind" 
 Georg Wilhelm Friedric Hegel, The Phenomenology of Mind
 Robert Anthony, Beyond Positive Thinking: A No-Nonsense Formula for Getting the Results You Want
 Martin E Moore, The Universal Mind & I: Intelligent Spiritual Philosophy
 Charles Haanel, "Master Key System"

External links
 The Huang Po Doctrine of Universal Mind

Concepts in metaphysics
Spirituality
Conceptions of God